John Rutherfoord (January 31, 1861 – November 6, 1942) was an American lawyer and politician. A native of Goochland County, he represented it and Fluvanna for one term in the Virginia House of Delegates before being nominated to serve as a judge of Virginia's 9th Circuit Court. The son of Delegate John Coles Rutherfoord, his grandfather and namesake, John Rutherfoord, served as Governor of Virginia from 1841 to 1842.

References

External links 

1861 births
1942 deaths
Democratic Party members of the Virginia House of Delegates
20th-century American politicians